The following tables compare general and technical information for a variety of audio coding formats.

For listening tests comparing the perceived audio quality of audio formats and codecs, see the article Codec listening test.

General information

Notes 
 The 'Music' category is merely a guideline on commercialized uses of a particular format, not a technical assessment of its capabilities.  (For example, in terms of marketshare, MP3 and AAC dominate the personal audio market, though many other formats are comparably well suited to fill this role from a purely technical standpoint.)
 First public release date is first of either specification publishing or source releasing, or in the case of closed-specification, closed-source codecs, is the date of first binary releasing. Many developing codecs have pre-releases consisting of pre-1.0 versions and perhaps 1.0 release candidates (RCs), although 1.0 may not necessarily be the release version.
 Latest stable version is that of specification or reference tools.
 If there happens to be OSI licensed software available for a particular format, this does not necessarily permit one to use said codec free of charge. Likewise, if there is only proprietary licensed software available for a particular format, one might be able to use the codec free of charge.

Operating system support

Multimedia frameworks support

Technical details

Notes 
 The latency listed here is the total delay (frame size, plus all lookahead) at the normal operating sample rate (typically 44.1 kHz).
 Lossless compression will have a variable bit rate.

See also 

 Comparison of audio player software
 Comparison of video player software
 List of codecs
 List of open-source codecs
 Comparison of video codecs
 Comparison of video container formats

References

External links 
 Comparative test April, 2004
 EBU subjective listening tests on low-bitrate audio codecs
 Hydrogenaudio comparison of lossless formats
 Tsabary, Eldad. "A Survey of Audio Coders for Electronic-Art Music." eContact! 9.4 — Perte auditive et sujets connexes / Hearing (Loss) and Related Issues (May 2007). Montréal: CEC.
 Rodman, Jeffrey "VoIP to 20 kHz: Codec Choices for High Definition Voice Telephony" (July, 2008)

 
Audio Codecs
Audio coding